Bolívar Pagán Lucca (May 16, 1897 – February 9, 1961) was a Puerto Rican historian, journalist, and politician.

Early years
Pagán was born in Guayanilla, Puerto Rico. He received his primary education in the public schools of Adjuntas, and went to secondary school in the city of Ponce. While still in school in Ponce, he was a contributor to the newspapers El Día, Nosotros, Renacimiento, and Puerto Rico Ilustrado and editor to both La Idea and La Aurora. In 1919 Pagán became the vice president of the Socialist Party of Puerto Rico, a pro-statehood, pro-labor party (not to be confused with the Puerto Rican Socialist Party founded in the 1970s).

Schooling
In 1921 he graduated with a law degree from the University of Puerto Rico School of Law; the same year he was admitted to the bar and began to practice law in San Juan. The following year he served as judge of Fajardo, Puerto Rico.

Political career
In 1924, Pagán ran unsuccessfully as a Socialist Party of Puerto Rico candidate for election to the Puerto Rican Senate. The following year, he began a four-year tenure as city treasurer of San Juan. In 1928, he ran again for the Puerto Rican Senate, but was not elected. He succeeded on his third try, and served as a member of the Puerto Rican Senate from 1933 until 1939, rising to leadership positions such as president pro-tempore and majority floor leader. While in the Puerto Rican Senate, he worked on legislation of social and cultural importance, such as universal suffrage, workers' compensation, and the creation of the Instituto de Literatura Puertorriqueña. He also served as mayor for the city of San Juan, Puerto Rico in 1936 till 1937.

In 1939 Pagán was appointed Resident Commissioner to the U.S. House of Representatives by the Governor of Puerto Rico, William Leahy, to fill the vacancy caused by the death of Pagán's father-in-law, Santiago Iglesias. In 1940, he was elected Resident Commissioner under the auspices of a coalition between the Socialist Party and the Republican Union.

In the 78th Congress Pagán was appointed to serve on the Committees on Agriculture, Labor, and the Territories. The following Congress, in addition to the previous committee assignments, he was appointed to the Committees on Insular Affairs, Military Affairs, and Naval Affairs. In Congress he continued the work of his father-in-law and successfully advocated the extension of social security benefits to Puerto Rico, and the application of workers' compensation laws to the Island.

Pagán pushed for Puerto Ricans to elect their own governors. He introduced a number of bills to achieve this, but they were not passed during his tenure. In addition, he brought to the attention of Congress the dissatisfaction of some Puerto Ricans with Governor Rexford G. Tugwell. Pagán returned to Puerto Rico, and was again elected to the Senate of Puerto Rico, was reelected in 1948, and served until 1953.

Later years
He resumed his law practice in San Juan until his death on February 9, 1961. He was buried at the Puerto Rico Memorial Cemetery in Carolina, Puerto Rico.

Major publications
Historia de los Partidos Politicos Puertorriqueños (1898-1956). Librería Campos, San Juan, Puerto Rico, 1959.
America y Otras Paginas. Imprenta La Correspondencia, San Juan, Puerto Rico, 1922.
Ley Municipal Revisada, Anotada y Comentada. Imprenta La Correspondencia, San Juan, Puerto Rico, 1925.
Ideales en Marcha. Imprenta Venezuela, San Juan, Puerto Rico, 1939.
Puerto Rico: The Next State. Imprenta Dwyer, Washington, D.D., 1942.
Crónicas de Washington. Editorial Stylo, Ciudad de Mejico, Mejico, 1949.
Historia de los Partidos Politicos Puertorriqueños. Litografía Real Hermanos, Inc., San Juan, Puerto Rico, 1959.

See also
List of Puerto Ricans
List of Hispanic Americans in the United States Congress

References

|-

|-

1897 births
1961 deaths
20th-century American politicians
Mayors of San Juan, Puerto Rico
Members of the Senate of Puerto Rico
People from Guayanilla, Puerto Rico
Presidents pro tempore of the Senate of Puerto Rico
20th-century Puerto Rican lawyers
Puerto Rican people of Spanish descent
Resident Commissioners of Puerto Rico
Republican Party members of the United States House of Representatives
Socialist Party (Puerto Rico) politicians
University of Puerto Rico alumni